Sayed Morad Khan, was a Shah of Iran who reigned from January 23, 1789 until May 10, 1789. He was the eighth king of the Zand dynasty. His brief reign is indicative of the ruthless and brutal struggle for power that prevailed among members of the Zand family following the death of Karim Khan Zand in 1779.

Life
Sayed Murad Khan was a member of the court of his predecessor, Jafar Khan, in the Zand capital of Shiraz. It was apparently Jafar Khan's treatment of Sayed Murad Khan that led the latter to plot the king's overthrow. Sayed Murad Khan had been governor of Shiraz but was later confined with his family and, according to one account beaten on Jafar Khan's orders in an effort to force him to divulge his wealth.

In 1789 a group of individuals, led by Sayed Morad Khan conspired to poison Jafar Khan. A female slave was employed to carry out their wishes. Sayed Morad Khan and his followers overcame the weakened shah, killing him, decapitating him and throwing his head from the citadel.

After the murder of Jafar Khan, Sayed Morad became the new Shah of Iran. Jafar Khan's son, Lotf Ali Khan, then marched to Shiraz, where he was popular among the people. Sayed Morad Khan held out for a short while in the city's citadel, but after reigning for less than 4 months he was forced to surrender and was executed. Lotf Ali Khan succeeded him on May 10, 1789.

References

Sources
Perry, John R., Karim Khan Zand A History of Iran 1747-1779, Univ. of Chicago Press, 1979, pg. 299 
Waring, Edward Scott, "A Tour to Sheeraz by the Route of Kazroon and Feerozabad", Elibron Classics, 2005.

External links
Rulers of Iran

Zand monarchs
Year of birth missing
Murdered Persian monarchs
1789 deaths
18th-century murdered monarchs
1789 murders in Asia